The United State of Women Summit was a summit held in Washington, D.C. focused on gender equality in the United States. The summit was hosted by the White House, the U.S. Department of State, the U.S. Department of Labor, and the Aspen Institute.

Background
The White House first announced the summit on January 29, 2016, with the theme "Today we change tomorrow." Originally scheduled for May 23, the summit was postponed to June 14.

On June 7, First Lady Michelle Obama announced the summit on a video, alongside Meryl Streep, Oprah Winfrey, Tina Fey, Laverne Cox, Kerry Washington, Shonda Rhimes, Cecile Richards, and Jessica Williams.

Agenda
The summit was dedicated to discussing a number of topics, including economic empowerment, equal pay for equal work, women's health, women's education, violence against women, entrepreneurship, and civic engagement.

Ciiru Waithaka, a Kenya entrepreneur, was lauded by Michelle Obama. She recognised their common ancestry and said "You Go Girl". Obama noted that Waithaka had doubled her production of school furniture thanks to a loan of 10,000 by Goldman Sachs. Obama recognised her as a woman who was helping other women and families to follow her lead.

President Barack Obama, one of the key speakers at the summit, was introduced by child entrepreneur Mikaila Ulmer. He discussed feminism, violence committed against women by groups such as ISIL and Boko Haram, and the progress made by his administration in supporting family leave and the minimum wage. Vice President Joe Biden was another key speaker, citing campus sexual assault as a major issue.

Participants
Barack Obama, President of the United States
Michelle Obama, First Lady of the United States
Joe Biden, Vice President of the United States
Valerie Jarrett, Senior Advisor to the President
Loretta Lynch, U.S. Attorney General
Thomas Perez, U.S. Secretary of Labor
Heather Higginbottom, Deputy Secretary of State for Management and Resources
Walter Isaacson, President of the Aspen Institute
Nancy Pelosi, House Democratic Leader
Cecile Richards, President of Planned Parenthood
Connie Britton
Kerry Washington
Oprah Winfrey
Warren Buffett
Camila María Concepción
Fay Cobb Payton

See also
White House Council on Women and Girls
White House Task Force to Protect Students from Sexual Assault
ARC3 Survey
United States Women's Bureau

References

External links

 

2016 conferences
2016 in Washington, D.C.
Feminism and health
Obama administration initiatives
United States Department of State
United States Department of Labor
June 2016 events in the United States